Leocratides kimuraorum (Japanese: Kimura-hanakago-otohime-gokai) is a species of marine worm belonging to Hesionidae, which is known for the intensity of its intraspecific fighting.

L. kimuraorum produces one of the loudest sounds in the ocean, a popping sound, at 157 dB (at a reference pressure of 1 μPa) at 1 m, with frequencies in the 1–100 kHz range, similar to the snapping shrimps.

Discovery 
The worm was first discovered in 2017. Discovered in Sagami Bay, the Japanese name of the worm is Kimura-hanakago-otohime-gokai.

Taxonomy 
Other members of the genus Leocratides — worms inhabiting Aphrocallistes sponges — include L. ehlersi and L. filamentosus.

Leocratides kimuraorum can be distinguished by the length of its antennae, which are as long as palps.

Description 
The worm has 21 segments and 16 of them bear chaetae (the bristled setae of polychaetes). The face is somewhat flattened. The body is cylindrical, but tapers slightly toward the posterior end. In life, the worm is transparent, with ring-shaped integument (scaly ridges) along the back, and discontinuous brown stripe markings. Like other members of its genus, Leocratides kimuraorum inhabits hexactinellid sponges.

Behavior 
In a behavior that researchers called "mouth-fighting," the worms approach each other headfirst with their mouths open. During these encounters, the pharynx muscles expand rapidly, forming a cavitation bubble that then collapses and produces a loud "pop" while the worms launch into each other. They may use this mouth-fighting to defend territory or living chambers from other worms. The production of this sound implies unique and extreme biomechanics for a soft-bodied organism.
The sound produced is 157 decibels and at ultra high frequencies.

References 

Polychaetes
Phyllodocida
Animals described in 2017
Fauna of the Pacific Ocean